Micromyzus kalimpongensis, is an aphid in the superfamily Aphidoidea in the order Hemiptera. It is a true bug and sucks sap from plants.

References 

 http://animaldiversity.org/accounts/Micromyzus_kalimpongensis/classification/
 http://aphid.speciesfile.org/Common/basic/Taxa.aspx?TaxonNameID=1166845
 https://www.gbif.org/species/2071499

Agricultural pest insects
Macrosiphini